Man at the Carlton Tower is a 1961 British crime film directed by Robert Tronson and starring Maxine Audley, Lee Montague and Allan Cuthbertson. Part of the long-running series of Edgar Wallace Mysteries films made at Merton Park Studios, it is based on the 1931 novel The Man at the Carlton.

Cast
 Maxine Audley as Lydia Daney 
 Lee Montague as Tim Jordan 
 Allan Cuthbertson as Det. Supt. Cowley 
 Terence Alexander as Johnny Time 
 Alfred Burke as Harry Stone 
 Nigel Green as Lew Daney 
 Nyree Dawn Porter as Mary Greer 
 Geoffrey Frederick as Det. Sgt. Pepper 
 Geoffrey Lumsden as Stocker 
 Frank Forsyth as Commissionaire 
 Steven Scott as Gallo 
 Keith Ashley as Junior Clerk 
 Howard Taylor as Reception Clerk 
 Nancy Roberts as Barmaid 
 Adrian Oker as Waiter

References

Bibliography
 Goble, Alan. The Complete Index to Literary Sources in Film. Walter de Gruyter, 1999.

External links

1961 films
British crime films
1961 crime films
Films set in England
Merton Park Studios films
Films directed by Robert Tronson
Films based on British novels
Edgar Wallace Mysteries
1960s English-language films
1960s British films